The 1983 Team Ice Racing World Championship was the fifth edition of the Team World Championship. The final was held on ?, 1983, in Berlin in West Germany. West Germany won their first title ending a run of four consecutive victories for the Soviet Union.

Classification

See also 
 1983 Individual Ice Speedway World Championship
 1983 Speedway World Team Cup in classic speedway
 1983 Individual Speedway World Championship in classic speedway

References 

Ice speedway competitions
World